Marthurin Janssaud (1857 in Manosque, France – 1940) was a French painter.

Career
Little is known of Janssaud's early life other than he left his home province before the onset of World War I. Like many artists of the day he initially traveled to Paris, yet in time he became more interested in the scenes of Brittany and Concarneau. Here he would enjoy painting vivid ocean scenes and townspeople.

Description of works
Henri Belbeoch comments; “Janssaud’s portrayal of women in their hitched-up skirts, seeking coolness under the stormy sky, demonstrates a certain realism that distinguishes his work from other pastoral scenes favoured by his bourgeois audience. Janssaud gave his public that which he liked to paint.”

References

External links
Mathurin Janssaud at Milmo-penny Fine Art
Mathurin Janssaud at Artnet

1857 births
1940 deaths
19th-century French painters
French male painters
20th-century French painters
20th-century French male artists
Realist painters
19th-century French male artists